Aino Hivand (born 3 May 1947) is a Norwegian-Sami visual artist and children's book writer with an expressionist and abstract style.

Biography
Aino Hivand was born in Bugøyfjord, Sør-Varanger municipality. She studied decorative arts at Dalane High School in the 1986/87 school year and studied at Stavanger School of Art, spring 1986. Hivand resides in Samuelsberg in the municipality of Kåfjord in Troms county.

Exhibits
1989, Galleri du Nord, Stavanger
1991, Gallery Bryggerhuset, Egersund
1996, SDG, Sami Art Center, Karasjok
1999, Bugøyfjord Grendehus
1999, Savio Museum, Kirkenes
2001, Artist House, Gvarv
2006, Gallery NK, Vardø
2008, Finnmark county municipality's guest studio, Vadsø
2010, Parkalompolo, Sweden
2014, Várjjat Sámi Museums (Varanger Sami Museum)
2015, Contemporary Museum of Northern People

Selected works 
 1997  Sáhpán-Bánni báhtara
 2004  Čoarvevieksá Lieđđeriemut
 2009  Muittátgo; Husker du
 2014  Atrata
 2016  Garjjáid gižžu; Ravnenes kamp, (barnebok, nordsamisk og norsk, tekst og illustrasjoner) Gollegiella forlag

Awards and honors
1989, Arctic Product - product competition - 1st prize
1990, Project Neiden A / L - product competition - 1st and 2nd prize
1991, Sør-Varanger Joint Association - Logo competition - 1st prize
1992, Sør-Varanger Kongegave 1992 - 3rd prize
1996, Sálas - Logo competition - 1st prize
1998, Saami Council Literature Prize 
2000, Jelovica Prize, from Word festival art on paper, Sloveni
2000, John Savio stipend
2001, SKFV, Travel Scholarship
2004, Sámiraddi / Sami Council Work Scholarship
2009, SKFV, Material Scholarship
2012, SKFV, Material Scholarship

References

1947 births
Living people
People from Sør-Varanger
20th-century Norwegian women artists
21st-century Norwegian women artists
20th-century Norwegian women writers
21st-century Norwegian women writers
Sámi artists